Paul Johannes Gerardus Verhaegh (born 1 September 1983) is a former Dutch professional footballer who played as a right-back.

Club career
Verhaegh began his career at PSV Eindhoven, making 33 league appearances while on loan at AGOVV Apeldoorn. He then moved to FC Den Bosch in 2004, making 32 league appearances, before moving to Vitesse after the 2004–05 season. After four years, he left Vitesse and signed a two-year contract with FC Augsburg on 27 May 2010.

After having spent seven years with FC Augsburg, Verhaegh switched to VfL Wolfsburg, after agreeing to a two-year deal. In April 2019, it was announced that Verhaegh had been released by the club with immediate effect.

On 5 June 2019, Dutch club FC Twente signed Verhaegh on a one-year contract with the club following a medical. Verhaegh announced his retirement on 3 June 2020.

International career
Verhaegh was a member of the Netherlands U-21 squad that won the 2006 UEFA European Under-21 Championship.

He made his debut for the senior national team against Portugal in a 1–1 friendly draw on 15 August 2013. He was also part of the squad for the 2014 FIFA World Cup in Brazil. He started in the round of 16 match against Mexico, where the Netherlands relied on late goals to progress to the quarter-finals on their way to finishing third.

Career statistics

Club

International

Honours
FC Augsburg
Maspalomas Cup: 2014
2. Bundesliga runner-up: 2010–11

Netherlands U21
UEFA European Under-21 Championship: 2006

Netherlands
FIFA World Cup third place: 2014

References

External links
 

Living people
1983 births
Footballers from Eindhoven
Dutch footballers
Association football defenders
Netherlands under-21 international footballers
Netherlands international footballers
2014 FIFA World Cup players
Eredivisie players
Eerste Divisie players
Bundesliga players
2. Bundesliga players
SBV Vitesse players
FC Den Bosch players
PSV Eindhoven players
AGOVV Apeldoorn players
FC Augsburg players
VfL Wolfsburg players
FC Twente players
Dutch expatriate footballers
Dutch expatriate sportspeople in Germany
Expatriate footballers in Germany